The Serbian First League (Serbian: Prva liga Srbije) is the second-highest football league in Serbia. The league is operated by the Serbian FA. 18 teams will compete in this league for the 2008–09 season. Five teams will be promoted to the Serbian Superliga and two will be relegated the Serbian League, the third-highest division overall in the Serbian football league system.

League table

References

See also
 List of football clubs in Serbia
 Serbia national football team
 Serbian First League
 Serbian League

Serbian First League seasons
2008–09 in Serbian football leagues
Serbia